Naked Colours is a live album by American avant-garde jazz composer, bandleader, and multi-instrumentalist Hal Russell and pianist Joel Futterman recorded in 1991 and released on the Silkheart label in 1994.

Reception
The Allmusic review awarded the album 4 stars stating "This is a mighty date with plenty for free jazz fans to celebrate".

Track listing
All compositions by Joel Futterman
 "Part 1: 278,000 Shades" - 19:31   
 "Part 2: Solid Colours" - 21:56   
 "Part 3: Naked Colours" - 23:43

Personnel
Hal Russell - tenor saxophone, soprano saxophone, trumpet
Joel Futterman - piano, recorder
Jay Oliver - bass
Robert Adkins - drums

References

Silkheart Records live albums
Joel Futterman live albums
Hal Russell live albums
1994 live albums